Channel 1 (HaArutz HaRishon, lit. The First Channel, sometimes called 1 ערוץ, Arutz Ahat) was one of the oldest television channels in Israel (with only the Israeli Educational Television being older) and one of five terrestrial channels in the country (along with Channel 2, Channel 10, Channel 33 and the Knesset Channel).

Run by the Israel Broadcasting Authority, it started broadcasting on 2 May 1968, and was largely funded through a television licence, though there were some adverts. With the abolition of Israel Broadcasting Authority and the establishment of the Israeli Public Broadcasting Corporation, Channel 1 closed down on 14 May 2017 and was replaced a few days later with Kan 11.

History

The law creating the Israel Broadcasting Authority was passed by the Knesset on 6 June 1965, with the television channel starting broadcasts on 2 May 1968. Initially in black and white, colour television was used from 13 January 1982, although occasional colour transmissions had been made earlier, most notably the Egyptian president's visit to Israel in 1977 and the Eurovision Song Contest 1979.

In 1985, the "Israel Television in Arabic" department was awarded the prestigious Israel Prize, for its special contribution to society and the State.

Until 1994 the channel was called HaTelevizia HaKlalit (lit. General Television) or HaTelevizia HaYisraelit (lit. Israeli Television), but became known as Channel 1 once Channel 2 started broadcasting on 4 November 1993.

Technology

Since broadcasting began in 1968 the channel broadcast in PAL format. Since digital broadcasting in Israel began it also can be viewed for free using small box. In May 2010, Channel 1 became the first public broadcasting house in Israel to offer HD broadcasting. Their first HD broadcasts were the semi-finals and the final of the Eurovision Song Contest 2010, and later the FIFA World Cup 2010. The channel broadcast Mabat, Channel 1's news program, in HD a year after. The channel offered a mixed selection of SD and HD programmes produced both locally and abroad. The HD feed was made available in late 2011, owing to the events of earlier in the year, when television stations in Israel ended analogue broadcasts.

Advertisements
Although the channel did not carry standard adverts, during breaks in high-profile programmes (such as coverage of Maccabi Tel Aviv's Euroleague matches) it displayed text on the screen, advertising companies, which was read out word-for-word by an announcer.

In addition to the text advertising, Channel 1 also showed public information films commissioned by the government. During the election time it shows the party political broadcasts.

See also
Television in Israel
David Witzthum
KAN 11

References

External links

Official website (in Hebrew)

 
Television channels and stations established in 1968
Television channels and stations disestablished in 2017
Defunct television channels in Israel
1968 establishments in Israel
Israel Broadcasting Authority
Television channel articles with incorrect naming style
2017 disestablishments in Israel